East Attica is one of the regional units of Greece. It is part of the region of Attica. The regional unit covers the eastern part of the urban agglomeration of Athens, and also the rural area to its east.

Administration

The regional unit East Attica is subdivided into 13 municipalities. These are (number as in the map in the infobox):

Acharnes (2)
Dionysos (4)
Kropia (5)
Lavreotiki (6)
Marathon (Marathonas, 7)
Markopoulo Mesogaias (8)
Oropos (13)
Paiania (9)
Pallini (1)
Rafina-Pikermi (10)
Saronikos (11)
Spata-Artemida (12)
Vari-Voula-Vouliagmeni (3)

With respect to parliamentary elections East Attica belongs to the electoral district of Attica.

Prefecture

As a part of the 2011 Kallikratis government reform, the regional unit East Attica was created out of the former prefecture East Attica. The prefecture had the same territory as the present regional unit. At the same time, the municipalities were reorganised, according to the table below.

Provinces
Before the abolishment of the provinces of Greece in 2006, part of the East Attica prefecture was in the Attica Province, which also covered part of West Attica.

See also
List of settlements in Attica

References

External links
Official website 

 
Regional units of Attica
Prefectures of Greece